2013–14 season of Argentine football is the 123rd season of competitive football in Argentina.

National teams

Men's
This section covers Argentina men's matches from August 1, 2013, to July 31, 2014.

Friendlies

2014 World Cup qualifiers

2014 FIFA World Cup

References

External links
AFA
Argentina on FIFA.com
Soloascenso.com.ar

 
Seasons in Argentine football